The bootlace worm (Lineus longissimus) is a species of ribbon worm and one of the longest known animals, with specimens up to  long being reported, although this has not been confirmed. Its mucus is highly toxic.

Taxonomy
The bootlace worm is in the phylum Nemertea or ribbon worms. It is the most common nemertean found along the coasts of Britain.

Description
Bootlace worms may grow very long but are usually only  in width. The body is brown with lighter (longitudinal) stripes. Its mucus contains a relatively strong neurotoxin which it uses as a defense against predators. When handled, it produces large amounts of thick mucus with a faint pungent smell, reminiscent of iron or sewage. This toxic mucus has been shown to kill crabs and cockroaches, and could have applications as an agricultural insecticide.

However, records of extreme length should be taken with caution, because the bodies of nemerteans are flexible and can easily stretch to much more than their usual length.

Like other nemerteans, Lineus longissimus feeds using its eversible proboscis. As it is in the class Anopla, its proboscis is not armed with a barbed stylet. Instead, it has a cluster of sticky filaments at the end of its proboscis that it uses to immobilize prey.

Habitat
Lineus longissimus can be found on Norway's and Britain's coasts,on the Danish east coast and also on Sweden's west coast.

References

External links

 
 
 
 Lineus longissimus (Gunnerus, 1770) (accepted name) Catalogue of Life: 30 April 2017

Marine fauna of Europe
Lineidae
Animals described in 1770
Taxa named by Johan Ernst Gunnerus